Neanthophylax tenebrosus is the species of the Lepturinae subfamily in long-horned beetle family. This beetle is distributed in United States. Adult beetle feeds on mountain hemlock, and red fir.

Subtaxons 
There are three subspecies in species:
 Neanthophylax tenebrosus nigrolineatus (Van Dyke, 1917) 
 Neanthophylax tenebrosus orientalis Linsley & Chemsak, 1972 
 Neanthophylax tenebrosus tenebrosus (LeConte, 1873)

References

Lepturinae
Beetles described in 1873